Hercules the Archer is a sculpture by Antoine Bourdelle, originally made in 1909, which now exists in many versions.  It was a commission of the financier and philanthropist Gabriel Thomas, as a single copy in gilt-bronze in April 1909; Bourdelle worked on the sculpture in the summer of 1909. It was cast by Eugène Rudier, and it was exhibited at the National Society of Fine Arts in 1910, and much appreciated.  The dimensions were 2.50 m × 2.40 m.

The second version was developed around 1923. It differed from the first version with additions of reliefs on the rock right, representing the Lernaean Hydra and the Nemean Lion. Finally a banner along the base of the sculpture and the monogram completed the work.

Background

Bourdelle was inspired by the myth of Hercules, he chose the sixth of them : the extermination of the Stymphalian birds. In the Greek mythology, the birds of this lake were monstrous, feeding on human flesh, which infesting the woods surrounding the lake Stymphale, in Arcadia, using their sharp-pointed feathers bronze (according to one of several versions) as arrows, to kill men and beasts, and devour.

For the creation of this work, Antoine Bourdelle asked his friend the captain Doyen-Parigot (1854–1916), whom he had met at the "Saturday Rodin" to pose for him. This military man was an accomplished sportsman. The deployment of the body and muscle tension required by archery highlight the muscles of the model. Bourdelle modified the head of the model at the request of  his friend who had requested for anonymity.

Bourdelle did several studies to produce a small sculpture, which he considered as completed in 1909. During the visit to his workshop, the patron Gabriel Thomas was fascinated by this sculpture and commissioned a monumental sculpture for the garden of his home in Bellevue.

International success
In 1914, Antoine Bourdelle became aware of the injury suffered because of the exclusivity granted to Gabriel Thomas. Indeed, after the Venice Biennale where Bourdelle had presented a cast of Hercules the Archer, he was forced to refuse to sell a bronze statue. Seeing Bourdelle's disappointment, Thomas agreed to end his exclusivity and allow Bourdelle to make further copies.  The first new sculpture went to Sweden in 1920.  Thereafter, Thomas made a new bronze which remained in his family until it was sold in 1991 to Drouot-Montaigne, this work is now in Tokyo.

After Thomas' agreement to concede his rights, a copy was given in 1916 to the Gallery of Modern Art in Rome. In 1920, the museum Waldemarsudde of Stockholm bought the first copy of Thomas. In 1923, copies were sold to museums in Brussels, Prague and New York. In 1925, the city of Toulouse provided a Hercules statue for its sports museum. In 1926, the Musée du Luxembourg in Paris bought a Hercules (it is now at the Musée d'Orsay). In 1927, the Musée des Beaux-Arts de Lyon had a copy in turn.  There are now a number of further versions in museums and cities.

Adolphe Willette made a caricature of the statue.

Belgium
 Antwerp, Middelheim museum, Nachtegalen Park

France
 Paris, Musée Bourdelle, Musée d'Orsay and Gare Montparnasse
 Montauban, musée Ingres
 Toulouse, place Héraklès
 Lyon, Musée des Beaux-Arts de Lyon
 Égreville, Jardin-musée Bourdelle d'Égreville

Germany
 Cologne, University of Cologne

Asia
 Tokyo, Japan, National Museum of Western Art (NMWA), Bridgestone Museum of Art and Tokyo Fuji Art Museum
 Hakone, Japan, Hakone Open Air Museum

America
 Buenos Aires, Argentina, in a garden of the quarter Recoleta (the statue is named El arquero)
 New Orleans, Louisiana, Sydney and Walda Besthoff Sculpture Garden, New Orleans Museum of Art
 New York, U.S., Metropolitan Museum of Art
 Los Angeles, U.S., Los Angeles County Museum of Art
 New York, U.S.,
Syracuse University Quad

Photos

The studies

The copies of the statue

Bibliography
 Dossier de l'Art N° 10 de January/February 1993
 Bourdelle by Ionel Jianou and Michel Dufet Edition Arted 1970
 Jardin-musée départemental Bourdelle d'Égreville by Hervé Joubeaux – Conservateur territorial du Patrimoine, May 2005

References

External links

 Hercules the Archer on Insécula
 Hercules the Archer on the Musée d'Orsay site

Sculptures by Antoine Bourdelle
1909 sculptures
Bronze sculptures in the United States
Bronze sculptures in Japan
Bronze sculptures in France
Bronze sculptures in Paris
Sculptures of the Museum of Fine Arts of Lyon
Bronze sculptures
Sculptures of Heracles
Statues in Japan
Statues in France
Sculptures of the Metropolitan Museum of Art
Sculptures of lions
Archery
Outdoor sculptures in Stockholm
Bronze sculptures in Sweden